Owch Darreh (also Romanized as Ūchdarreh) is a village in Hulasu Rural District, in the Central District of Shahin Dezh County, West Azerbaijan Province, Iran. At the 2006 census, its population was 74, in 16 families.

References 

Populated places in Shahin Dezh County